David Commins (born 1954) is an American scholar and Professor of History and Benjamin Rush Chair in the Liberal Arts and Sciences (1987) at Dickinson College. He is known for his works on Wahhabism.

See also 
 Namira Nahouza

References

1954 births
American Islamic studies scholars
Living people